J. Kevin Barlow is a Mi'kmaq from the Indian island of New Brunswick. He is a former Chief Executive Officer of the Canadian Aboriginal AIDS Network (CAAN).

Barlow worked in the aboriginal health field for over 25 years. He has presented his research in New Zealand, the United States, Mexico, and across Canada, exploring challenges in international HIV prevention and AIDS education.

He has worked primarily in the HIV/AIDS sector, and is Principal Investigator on a number of grants exploring cultural competence, mental health, and historical trauma. His leadership and advocacy earned him a national award for excellence in aboriginal programming in 2006.

In April 2013, an allegation of plagiarism was made by a former employee for a document written for and produced by the Aboriginal Healing Foundation in Ottawa, Ontario. The Aboriginal Healing Foundation had commissioned the report which included three bodies of work compiled by employees and contractors of the Canadian Aboriginal AIDS Network, to which it owned copyright. This allegation has never been proven nor admitted.

References

External links
 Cedar Project website

Publications
 J. Kevin Barlow, EXAMINING HIV/AIDS AMONG THE ABORIGINAL POPULATION IN CANADA: in the post-residential school era (2003), found at PDF

HIV/AIDS activists
Living people
Year of birth missing (living people)